Andrea Holt is a female former international table tennis player from England.

Table tennis career
She represented England at four successive World Table Tennis Championships, from 1991 until 1997, in the Corbillon Cup (women's team event).

She competed in the 1992 Summer Olympics and 1996 Summer Olympics.

She won 10 English National Table Tennis Championships, including five singles titles spanning from 1991 until 2004.

See also
 List of England players at the World Team Table Tennis Championships

References

Living people
1970 births
English female table tennis players
Olympic table tennis players of Great Britain
Table tennis players at the 1992 Summer Olympics
Table tennis players at the 1996 Summer Olympics
People from Radcliffe, Greater Manchester